D.e.s.t.i.t.u.t.i.o.n is the first full-length album by Australian Thrash metal band Allegiance, released in 1994. The album was produced at Planet Sound Studios in Perth, Western Australia by Dave Pinsky. The album was mastered in the Netherlands by Attie Bauw.

Track listing
"Intro" - 0:58
"Chaos Dies" - 3:30
"One Step Beyond" - 4:05
"Hate Frenzy" – 4:35
"Torn Between Two Worlds" – 5:39
"Destitution" - 3:59
"Morally Justified" - 4:00
"Path Of Lies" - 2:49
"Dealt The Cruel Hand" - 4:30
"Downward Spiral" - 4:21
"Twisted Minds" - 4:45
"Tranquility" - 3:17

Personnel 
 Conrad Higson – lead vocals
 Jason Stone – guitar, keyboards
 Tony Campo – guitar
 David Harrison – bass
 Glenn Butcher – drums
 Dave Pinsky – producer
 Allegiance – co-producer
 Les Williams – audio mixing
 Attie Bauw – audio mastering

Charts

References

1994 debut albums
Allegiance (Australian band) albums
PolyGram albums

sr:Деституција